Eslamabad-e Kord (also Romanized as Eslāmābād-e Kord; also known as Eslāmābād, Shāhābād, and Shāhābād-e Kord) is a village in Howmeh Rural District, in the Central District of Maneh and Samalqan County, North Khorasan Province, Iran. At the 2006 census, its population was 1,360, in 326 families.

References 

Populated places in Maneh and Samalqan County